Paparazzi, fully titled as Paparazzi Showbiz Exposed, was a Philippine showbiz oriented talk show, of TV5 which airs every Sunday afternoons. The show broadcasts live from Studio B of TV5 Complex.

On May 22, 2011, the show's timeslot was changed from 2:30pm to 4:00pm. On June 5, 2011, its original timeslot throughout its run was 4:00pm. On February 11, 2012, the show's timeslot was changed at 1:30pm.

The New Afternoon Talk Show gained positive reviews and critical acclaim and feedback by international followers because of its advances in the global talk through social media sites and websites available to watch with proper use of the program.

Hosts

Final hosts
 Cristy Fermin 
 Dolly Ann Carvajal 
 Zoren Legaspi 
 Mariel Rodriguez

Segment hosts
Mr. Fu (Paparazzada)

Former hosts
Hayden Kho 
Mo Twister 
Ruffa Gutierrez

Guest hosts
Alice Dixson (replacement for Ruffa Gutierrez and Dolly Ann Carvajal on June 26, 2011)
Lucy Torres-Gomez (replacement for Ruffa Gutierrez on November 6 and 13, 2011)
Precious Lara Quigaman (replacement for Ruffa Gutierrez on January 1, 2012)

Segments
Caught by Cristy
Hello Dolly
Paparazzada
Paparazzi Exclusive

Recurring segments
PressCon Express (Press Conference)

Discontinued segments
Ruffa Reveals
Extreme Close-Up
Confirmed or Denied
Hulala (Blind Item)
Bulong ng Palad

See also
List of programs aired by TV5 (Philippine TV network)

References

External links

2010 Philippine television series debuts
2012 Philippine television series endings
TV5 (Philippine TV network) original programming
Entertainment news shows in the Philippines
Philippine television talk shows
Filipino-language television shows